Coleophora markisaakovitshi is a moth of the family Coleophoridae.

References

markisaakovitshi
Moths described in 1998